The Pharmaceutical Society of Ireland (PSI) is the statutory and professional body responsible for regulation of pharmacists and community pharmacies in Ireland.  It is also responsible for overseeing the training of new pharmacists.  Registration with PSI is essential in order to practice as a pharmacist or operate a pharmacy in Ireland.

Functions
The Pharmaceutical Society of Ireland (PSI) regulates the pharmacy profession in the public interest. Inspection is an important part of this task. The PSI employs inspectors to inspect pharmacies and, where necessary, to secure evidence of contravention of legislation controlling the supply of poisons and controlled preparations.

The Education Unit of the PSI oversees the undergraduate education and pre-registration training of pharmacy students in the Irish schools of pharmacy at University College Cork, Trinity College, Dublin and Royal College of Surgeons in Ireland, to prepare them for registration as pharmacists.

The society publishes the Irish Pharmacy Journal (IPJ), the official journal of the Society.

Governance
Up to April 2007 the PSI's governing Council was elected solely by members of the society.  The Pharmacy Act 2007 reformed the society so that now 9 members of the council are elected by members of the society and the balance are appointed by the Minister for Health and Children to represent various sections of the public and health community.  At the first meeting of the Council of the new Pharmaceutical Society of Ireland in June 2007, Portumna pharmacist Mr Brendan Hayes was elected President and Lismore pharmacist Dr Bernard Leddy was elected Vice President.

External links
 The Pharmaceutical Society of Ireland

Ireland
Professional associations based in Ireland
Medical and health organisations based in the Republic of Ireland
Drugs in Ireland
Seanad nominating bodies